The 1984–85 Detroit Red Wings season was the Red Wings' 53rd season, the franchise's 59th.

Offseason

Regular season
On October 26, 1984, Paul Coffey of the Edmonton Oilers would be the last defenceman in the 20th Century to score four goals in one game. It occurred in a game versus the Detroit Red Wings.

Final standings

Schedule and results

Playoffs
They made it into the playoffs again and got swept in the first round in a best of five series by Chicago in 3 games, or 0-3.

Player statistics

Regular season
Scoring

Goaltending

Playoffs
Scoring

Goaltending

Note: GP = Games played; G = Goals; A = Assists; Pts = Points; +/- = Plus-minus PIM = Penalty minutes; PPG = Power-play goals; SHG = Short-handed goals; GWG = Game-winning goals;
      MIN = Minutes played; W = Wins; L = Losses; T = Ties; GA = Goals against; GAA = Goals-against average;  SO = Shutouts;

Awards and records

Transactions

Draft picks
Detroit's draft picks at the 1984 NHL Entry Draft held at the Montreal Forum in Montreal, Quebec.

Farm teams

See also
1984–85 NHL season

References

External links

Detroit Red Wings seasons
Detroit
Detroit
Detroit Red
Detroit Red